Alejandro Ocana, better known by his stage name 2Mex, is a rapper from Los Angeles, California. He is a member of The Visionaries and Of Mexican Descent. He has collaborated with underground hip hop artists such as Jel, Omid, Thavius Beck, Factor, Radioinactive, and Isaiah "Ikey" Owens. He is a member of the Project Blowed crew, and he is affiliated with Shape Shifters.

History
2Mex attended the Good Life Cafe open mic nights in 1992. Around that time, he founded Of Mexican Descent with Xololanxinxo.

In 1998, he released his first album with The Visionaries as well as the first Of Mexican Descent album, and he was featured on the OD (Omid) compilation album Beneath the Surface. In 1999, he was featured (with Xololanxinxo as Of Mexican Descent) on the Fat Jack compilation album Cater to the DJ, and he released his first solo album Fake It Till You Make It as The Mind Clouders with producer Mums the Word. In 2000, he was featured (as a member of the Afterlife Crew) on the Afterlife Records compilation Declaration of an Independent. He then released B-Boys in Occupied Mexico on Mean Street in 2001. Sweat Lodge Infinite was released on Temporary Whatever in 2003. The self-titled album, 2Mex, was released in 2004. He released My Fanbase Will Destroy You on Strange Famous Records in 2010. It features guest appearances from Murs, Prince Po, Busdriver and Nobody. In 2016, one of his legs was amputated due to complications from diabetes. He addressed the loss and other struggles in the 2017 album Lospital.

Film
2Mex is featured in Ava DuVernay's documentary This Is the Life, chronicling the Good Life Cafe in South Central, Los Angeles. The Good Life Cafe is the open-mic workshop where he first performed with Of Mexican Descent in 1992.

Publications
In 2021, 2Mex released a book called Word Murder, which features lyrics for 70 songs, 30 unreleased poems, a detailed biography, and photography by Gadzooks and Brian "B+" Cross.

Discography

Solo
Studio albums
B-Boys in Occupied Mexico (Mean Street, 2001)
Sweat Lodge Infinite (Temporary Whatever, 2003)
2Mex (Paladin Creative Super Co., 2004)
Over the Counter Culture (Up Above, 2005) (as SunGodSuns)
My Fanbase Will Destroy You (Strange Famous, 2010)
Lospital (Water the Plants, 2017)
Ghostwriting Songs for God (2021)

Mixtapes and EPs
Unreleased Hits (Memo, 1998) [mixtape]
Words. Knot Music. (Memo / Afterlife, 2000) [mixtape]
The Sweat (2002) [EP]
Knowhawk (Biofidelic / La2TheBay / Invisible Enemy, 2004) [mixtape]
Gloria Was a KROQer (Up Above, 2006) [EP]
Protect and Serve (2010) [mixtape]
Cartoon Boyfriend (2015) [mixtape]
Gentrification EP (2018) [EP]

Compilations
Essential 2Mex Road CD (2005)
New Wave Chola Road Mix (2006)
Singles: Volume One (2007)
Sound Hoarding Vol. 1 (2015)
Sound Hoarding Vol. 2 (2015)
Sound Hoarding Vol. 3 (2020)

Collaborations
Visionaries (2Mex with Dannu, DJ Rhettmatic, Key Kool, LMNO & Lord Zen)
Galleries (Up Above, 1998)
Sophomore Jinx (Up Above, 2000)
Pangaea (Up Above, 2004)
We Are the Ones (We've Been Waiting For) (Up Above, 2006)
Established 1995 (Up Above, 2007) [compilation]
V (2020)

Of Mexican Descent (2Mex with Xololanxinxo)
Exitos y mas exitos EP (1998) [EP]
Exitos y mas exitos (1998)
Of Mexican Descent (Demo 1992) (2020) [EP]

Look Daggers (2Mex with Isaiah Owens)
The Patience EP (2007) [EP]
Suffer in Style (2008)

Other collaborations
Fake It Until You Make It (1999) (with Mum's the Word, as The Mind Clouders)
Money Symbol Martyrs (2006) (with Life Rexall, as $martyr)
Break Up Your Make Up (2009) (with Deeskee, Die Young & Stacey Dee, as The Returners)
Blessing in Disguise (2010) (with Key Kool & LMNO)
Fallin' Angels (2011) (with Nobody, as SonGodSuns)
Like Farther... Like Sun... (2013) (with Maiselph)
Operation: Dark Winter December (2020) (with Anu322)

Guest appearances
Key-Kool & Rhettmatic - "Visionaries (Stop Actin' Scary)" from Kozmonautz (1995)
Nobody - "Shades of Orange" from Soulmates (2000)
Abstract Rude + Tribe Unique - "Frisbee" from P.A.I.N.T. (2001)
Existereo - "Morals" from Dirty Deeds & Dead Flowers (2001)
Jel vs. 2Mex - "D.I.Y. Partisan" (2002)
Busdriver & Radioinactive with Daedelus - "Barely Music" from The Weather (2003)
Dax, Neogen, Dert, Reconcile, Professor Who, Dokument, Chosen1, Griffin, Lazarus, Raphi, Drastic, Propaganda & Macho - "Remember This Day" from Underground Rise, Volume 1: Sunrise/Sunset (2003)
Omid - "Myth Behind the Man" from Monolith (2003)
Abstract Rude & Tribe Unique - "Flow and Tell" from Showtyme (2003)
Awol One - "Gagbuster" from Self Titled (2004)
Shape Shifters - "American Idle" from Was Here (2004)
Subtitle - "Crew Cut (for Sale)" from Young Dangerous Heart (2005)
Busdriver - "Sphinx's Coonery" from Fear of a Black Tangent (2005)
Ellay Khule - "Fading Rhythms" from Califormula (2006)
Prince Po - "Ask Me" from Prettyblack (2006)
Thavius Beck - "Dedicated to Difficulty" from Thru (2006)
Mestizo - "Back Wash" from Dream State  (2007)
The Gigantics - "Don't" from Die Already (2008)
Expedyte feat Louis Logic, Phakt - "Sunny Daze" from Life (2008)
Ceschi - "Same Old Love Song" (2009)
Neila - "Mercy Refused" from Better Late Than Never (2009)
Factor - "Mental Illness" from Lawson Graham (2010)
Radioinactive - "Mint Tea" from The Akashic Record (2013)
Self Provoked - "Trophies" from [The Propaganda] (2015)

References

External links
2Mex on Strange Famous Records

American rappers of Mexican descent
Chicano rap
Rappers from Los Angeles
Underground rappers
Living people
21st-century American rappers
Year of birth missing (living people)
Project Blowed
Hispanic and Latino American rappers